The City of Sheffield Youth Orchestra is an orchestra in Sheffield, England. It has about 90 players whose age range from 13 to 21 years, with half still being at school with the rest at college, many of them training as professional musicians. The orchestra assembles three times a year during holiday periods for concentrated training courses with tutors and conductors of professional standing. They have worked with many distinguished soloists including Natalie Clein, Matthew Barley and Leonel Morales.

The C.S.Y.O. is the only UK youth orchestra to be a triple winner in the Sainsbury's Youth Orchestra Series (the major UK youth orchestra competition), and in the finals on two other occasions.

Over the past few years the orchestra has performed in the Pablo Casals International Festival in Spain 2008, southern Poland in 2007, Croatia in 2002 and again at the Pula International Music Festival performing Swan Lake with the Bolshoi Ballet in 2005, invited to play at the inaugural concert of the 4th International Piano Festival in Granada, Spain in 2004, for the Lord Mayor of London at the Barbican concert hall in London, given highly acclaimed performances at the Edinburgh Fringe Festival in 1994, 1999 and 2003, represented the UK at the Second Festival of European Youth Orchestras in Florence, Italy in 2000. The orchestra was asked to record the backing track at Abbey Road Studios, London,  to a  commercial recording of John Lennon's last song. Prior to this the orchestra has toured in the Czech Republic, Germany, the Benelux countries, Switzerland, Norway, France, Spain and Poland. During summer 2009 the orchestra toured in the Leipzig area of Germany.

See also 
 List of youth orchestras

External links 
 City of Sheffield Youth Orchestra

English youth orchestras
Musical groups from Sheffield